Dorian O'Daniel (born September 4, 1994) is an American football linebacker who is currently a free agent. He played college football at Clemson.

Professional career
O'Daniel attended the NFL Scouting Combine in Indianapolis and completed all of the combine and positional drills. On March 15, 2018, he attended Clemson's pro day, but opted to stand on his combine numbers and only performed positional drills. O'Daniel also attended meetings and private workouts with multiple teams, including the Pittsburgh Steelers, Houston Texans, and Buffalo Bills. At the conclusion of the pre-draft process, O'Daniel was projected to be a third or fourth round pick by NFL draft experts and scouts. He was ranked as the sixth best outside linebacker prospect in the draft by DraftScout.com and was ranked the 11th best outside linebacker by Scouts Inc.

The Kansas City Chiefs selected O'Daniel in the third round (100th overall) of the 2018 NFL Draft. O'Daniel was the 13th linebacker drafted in 2018.

On May 30, 2018, the Kansas City Chiefs signed O'Daniel to a four-year, $3.34 million contract that includes a signing bonus of $761,516. O'Daniel won his first Super Bowl championship when the Chiefs defeated the San Francisco 49ers 31–20 in Super Bowl LIV.

On December 5, 2020, O'Daniel was placed on injured reserve with an ankle injury. On January 16, 2021, O'Daniel was activated off of the injured reserve ahead of the Chiefs' Divisional Round playoff game against the Cleveland Browns.

References

External links
Kansas City Chiefs bio
Clemson Tigers bio

1994 births
Living people
American football linebackers
Clemson Tigers football players
Kansas City Chiefs players
People from Olney, Maryland
Players of American football from Maryland
Sportspeople from Montgomery County, Maryland